Hanna Maria Karjalainen (born 8 July 1980 in Oulu) became known in 2003 when she won the Haluatko filmitähdeksi (Do You Want To Be A Film Star?) competition, where the prize was the central role in the film Levottomat 3. Karjalainen acted in the 2004 movie, but the role was more minor than promised. Before that, Karjalainen had acted in a minor role in the 2001 film Rölli ja metsänhenki.

Karjalainen is a University of Jyväskylä graduate.

From 2006 to 2009, Karjalainen acted in the MTV3 soap series Salatut elämät, where she played Laura Kiviranta's talkative cousin Salla Laitela (former Tervajoki, née Mattila).

Karjalainen has recorded R&B music with an alias "HannaB".

References

1980 births
Finnish film actresses
Living people
Finnish television actresses
Finnish soap opera actresses
Reality casting show winners
21st-century Finnish actresses
Actors from Oulu